David S. Gilbert (March 31, 1935 – July 1, 2019) was a politician in Newfoundland and Labrador. He represented Burgeo-Bay d'Espoir in the Newfoundland House of Assembly from 1985 to 1995.

The son of John William Gilbert, he was born in Haystack and was educated at Memorial University. Gilbert took part in the Regular Officer Training Plan of the Royal Canadian Navy. He later worked for the International Acceptance Corporation and also operated a Ford dealership. Gilbert served on the town council for Grand Falls.

He was elected to the Newfoundland assembly in 1985. Gilbert served in the provincial cabinet as Minister of Works, Services and Transportation. He died on July 1, 2019 at the age of 84.

References

Liberal Party of Newfoundland and Labrador MHAs
Members of the Executive Council of Newfoundland and Labrador
1935 births
2019 deaths